ODERACS-2 (Orbital Debris Radar Calibration Sphere 2) was a series of six spheres deployed from the shuttle mission STS-63, ODERACS-2A through -2. The purpose of the Orbital Debris Radar Calibration Sphere experiment was to calibrate the radars and telescopes used for orbital debris measurements by putting passive objects of known size and shape into orbit. The objects were 2, 4, and 6 inch spheres and three wire dipoles.

The ODERACS satellites launched aboard the Space Shuttle Discovery on 4 February 1995, at 04:57 from Kennedy Space Center's Launch Pad 39B alongside Spartan 204-F1. They were placed into a 51.6° orbit.

Specifications

References 

 ODERACS 2A National Space Science Data Center (NASA GSFC) 

Microsatellites
1995 in spaceflight
Radar calibration satellites